Sergei Zakharov may refer to:
 Sergei Yefimovich Zakharov (1900–1993), painter
 Sergei Georgievich Zakharov (1950–2019), lounge singer
 Sergei Aleksandrovich Zakharov (born 1984), footballer